The Daily Advance is an American, English-language daily newspaper based in Elizabeth City, North Carolina. The newspaper is owned by Cooke Communications.

Cooke Communications, a private company led by the son of Jack Kent Cooke, bought The Daily Advance in 2009 from Cox Newspapers as part of a 13-paper sale, along with other North Carolina papers The Daily Reflector and Rocky Mount Telegram.  The Daily Advance is now part of Adams Publishing Group.

The Daily Advance has a Facebook page for interacting with readers.

See also
 List of newspapers in North Carolina

References

Daily newspapers published in North Carolina
1911 establishments in North Carolina